Pubei County is a county in the south of Guangxi, China. It is under the administration of Qinzhou City.

Administration
Pubei's executive, legislature and judiciary are seated in Xiaojiang Town, together with its CPC and PSB branches.

Town / Township

Climate

References

 
Counties of Guangxi
Qinzhou